The Friendship 3 is a French ultralight aircraft with tandem seats, engineered in France and Switzerland, and assembled in Czech Republic by Ivanov Aircraft for the manufacturer, R,S & Associes SAS Erik Sanstroem of Versailles, Yvelines. Inspired by 1950s and 1960s light aircraft and motorgliders, the Friendship 3 is a two-place tandem-seat ultralight aircraft with dual controls, so that the rear seated passenger can also fly.

The company seems to have been founded 2012 and gone out of business in 2014.

Design and development
The Friendship 3 was designed for both soaring and cross-country powered flying, with a glide ratio of 24:1. The Friendship F3A has a composite fuselage; and wood and fabric for the wings with the main spars in carbon fiber. The aircraft was registered in France in late 2012.

Variants
Friendship 3 
F3A: Available with 80 hp Rotax 912 engine. 
F3B: Available with 100 hp Rotax 912 engine.

Specifications (Friendship F3A)

References

External links

 Official website
 Vol Moteur Magazine Flying Test of Friendship F3
 Volo Sportivo VS 28 Impressioni di volo Friendship F3

1990s Czech and Czechoslovakian ultralight aircraft
Single-engined tractor aircraft
Low-wing aircraft
Motor gliders
Aircraft first flown in 2012